The Zamu Music Awards was an annual awards show in Flanders (Belgium), where the most outstanding Flemish and international musicians of the past year were honored.

The Zamu Awards were founded ZaMu (Zangers en Muzikanten; the Flemish association of singers and musicians). ZaMu was discontinued in 2006, but the organization of the Zamu Awards was taken over by Muziekcentrum Vlaanderen (Flanders Music Center), under the name Music Industry Awards (MIA's). 

For most award categories, a jury of music journalists selects four nominees. The winners are voted by members of the Flemish music industry, such as musicians, managers and record labels. Exceptions are the awards for best song and best music DVD, where the votes of the public select the winner. 

A special award is the Lifetime Achievement Award, given each year to an artist to honor his or her complete creative career.

Awards winners

2006
Artists:
 Musician: Isolde Lasoen
 Singer: An Pierlé
 Live-act: dEUS
 Popular: Reborn
 Pop-rock: Ozark Henry
 Dance: Buscemi
 Roots: Wannes Van de Velde
 Focus: Goose
 Jazz: Alejandro Del Real

Records:
 Album: Wild Dreams of New Beginnings Admiral Freebee
 Song:  The Player Daan
 Video: The Player Daan
 Art Work: Jardin Secret Axelle Red

Lifetime Achievement Award:  Bobbejaan Schoepen

2005
Artists:
 Songwriter/composer: Tom Barman
 Musician: Mauro Pawlowski
 Singer: Bert Ostyn (Absynthe Minded)
 Live-act: Gabriel Ríos
 Popular: Sandrine
 Pop-rock: dEUS
 Dance: Arsenal
 Roots: Roland Van Campenhout
 Focus: Delavega
 International: The Black Eyed Peas

Records:
 Album: Pocket Revolution (dEUS)
 Song: "My Heroics, Part 1" (Absynthe Minded)
 Video: "I'm on a High" (Millionaire)
 Music DVD: Easter Sunday, live at AB (Ozark Henry)

Lifetime Achievement Award:  Dani Klein (Vaya Con Dios)

2004
Artists:
 Songwriter/composer: Piet Goddaer
 Musician: Steven De Bruyn
 Singer: Joost Zweegers (Novastar)
 Live-act: Clouseau
 Popular: Natalia
 Pop-rock: Zita Swoon
 Dance: Stijn
 Roots: Think of One
 Focus: Gabriel Ríos
 International: Joss Stone

Records:
 Album: Victory (Daan)
 Song: "Sadness" (Stash)
 Video: "Sadness" (Stash)

Lifetime Achievement Award: Raymond van het Groenewoud

2003
Artists:
 Songwriter/composer: Tom Van Laere (Admiral Freebee)
 Musician: Mauro Pawlowski
 Singer: Geike Arnaert
 Live-act: El Tattoo del Tigre
 Popular: Scala
 Pop-rock: Admiral Freebee
 Dance: Buscemi
 Roots: Roland
 Focus: Sioen
 International: Avril Lavigne

Records:
 Album: Admiral Freebee (Admiral Freebee)
 Song: "Rags 'n Run" (Admiral Freebee)
 Video: "Champagne" (Phil Dussol / Millionaire)

Musical industry:
 Producer: Jean Blaute
 Musical event: Lokerse Feesten
 Media: Brussel Vlaams (Studio Brussel)

Lifetime Achievement Award: Johan Verminnen

2002
Artists:
 Songwriter/composer: Daan Stuyven
 Musician: Philip Catherine
 Singer: Axelle Red
 Live-act: Arno
 Popular: Clouseau
 Pop-rock: Hooverphonic
 Dance: 2 Many DJs
 Roots: Think Of One
 Focus: Neeka
 International: Britney Spears

Records:
 Album: Jacky Cane (Hooverphonic)
 Song: "En Dans" (Clouseau)

Musical industry:
 Producer: Jean-Marie Aerts
 Musical event: Pukkelpop
 Media: All Areas (Studio Brussel)

Lifetime Achievement Award: Adamo

2001
Artists:
 Songwriter/composer: Marc Moulin
 Musician: Mauro Pawlowski
 Singer: Mauro Pawlowski
 Live-act: El Tattoo Del Tigre
 Popular: Clouseau
 Pop-rock: Ozark Henry
 Dance: Buscemi
 Roots: El Fish & Roland
 Focus: Flip Kowlier
 International: blink-182

Records:
 Album: Ocharme ik (Flip Kowlier)
 Song: "Nothing Really Ends" (dEUS)

Musical industry:
 Producer: Piet Goddaer
 Musical event: Pukkelpop
 Media: Pili Pili (Radio 1)

Lifetime Achievement Award: Philip Catherine

2000
Artists:
 Songwriter/composer: Joost Zweegers (Novastar)
 Musician: Lars Van Bambost
 Singer: Geike Arnaert
 Live-act: De Nieuwe Snaar
 Popular: Belle Perez
 Pop-rock: Hooverphonic
 Dance: Buscemi
 Roots: Laïs
 Focus: Das Pop
 International: Eminem

Records:
 Album: Novastar (Novastar)
 Song: "Mad About You" (Hooverphonic)

Musical industry:
 Producer: Alex Callier
 Musical event: Rock Werchter
 Media: Plankenkoorts - Zomerfestivals (Canvas)

Lifetime Achievement Award: Willem Vermandere

1999
Artists:
 Artist: Soulwax
 Dutch-language artist: Raymond van het Groenewoud
 Musician: Bart Maris
 Songwriter/composer: Piet Goddaer
 Singing: Laïs
 Live-act: Soulwax
 Dance: Jan Van Biesen
 Focus: Arid (band)
 International: Madonna

Records:
 Album: Out of Africa (Helmut Lotti)
 Song: "My Bond With You And Your Planet: Disco!" (Zita Swoon)

Musical industry:
 Producer: Alex Callier
 Recording studio: Galaxy
 Musical event: De Nachten
 Media: Belgian Pop & Rock Archives

Lifetime Achievement Award: Rocco Granata

1998
Artists:
 Band: K's Choice
 Dutch-language band: Gorki
 Musician: Vincent Pierins
 Songwriter/composer: Raymond van het Groenewoud
 Singer: Axelle Red
 Dutch-language singer: Raymond van het Groenewoud
 Live-act: El Fish
 Jazz-act: Aka Moon
 Functional music: Fonny Dewulf
 Breakthrough: Dead Man Ray
 International: Backstreet Boys

Records:
 Album cover: Much Against Everyone's Advice (Soulwax)

Musical industry:
 Producer: Jean Blaute
 Technician: Peter Bulckens
 Recording studio: Groove
 Musical event: Folkfestival Dranouter
 Music venue: AB
 Music photographer: Marco Mertens
 Music journalist: Jan Delvaux
 Radio program: Cucamonga (Radio 1)
 TV program: Dancing in the street (VRT)

Lifetime Achievement Award: Roland

1997
Artists:
 Band: K's Choice
 Dutch-language band: De Mens
 Songwriter/composer: Stef Kamil Carlens
 Musician: Vincent Pierins
 Singer: Axelle Red
 Dutch-language singer: Frank Vander Linden (De Mens)
 Live-act: Arno
 Jazz-act: Aka Moon
 Functional music: Stef Kamil Carlens
 Breakthrough: Hoodoo Club
 Musical export: K's Choice
 International: Jamiroquai

Records:
Album (sales): Lotti Goes Classic 3 (Helmut Lotti)
 Single (sales): "Als de dag van toen" (Mama's Jasje)
 Airplay: "Als de dag van toen" (Mama's Jasje)
 Album cover: Seven (Zap Mama)

Musical industry:
 Producer: Jean Blaute
 Technician: Peter Bulckens
 Recording studio: Galaxy
 Music venue: AB
 Musical event: Folkfestival Dranouter
 Music journalist: Gert Van Nieuwenhoven
 Music photographer: Guy Kocken
 Radio program: BasSta! (Studio Brussel)
 TV program: Lalala Live (VTM)

Lifetime Achievement Award: Arno

1996
Artists:
 Band: dEUS
 Dutch-language band: Clouseau
 Songwriter/composer: Tom Barman
 Musician: Vincent Pierins
 Singer: Axelle Red
 Dutch-language singer: Frank Vander Linden (De Mens)
 Live-act: Evil Superstars
 Jazz-act: Kris Defoort
 Functional music: Noordkaap
 Entertaining band: Lou Roman
 Breakthrough: Hoover
 Musical export: Best Of (Vaya Con Dios)
 International: Björk

Records:
 Album: In a Bar, Under the Sea (dEUS)
 Single: "Little Arithmetics" (dEUS)
 Video: "Theme From Turnpike" (dEUS)
 Album cover: Love Is Okay (Evil Superstars/Herman Houbrechts)

Musical industry:
 Manager: Piet Roelen
 Producer: Jean Blaute
 Technician: Peter Bulckens
 Recording studio: Galaxy
 Music venue: AB
 Musical event: Pukkelpop
 Music journalist: Patrick De Witte
 Music photographer: Guy Kocken
 Radio presenter: Jan Hautekiet
 Radio program: BasSta!
 TV program: Tien Om Te Zien

Lifetime Achievement Award: Will Tura

1995
Artists:
 Band: K's Choice
 Songwriter/composer: Gert Bettens
 Dutch-language band: Clouseau
 Musician: Eric Melaerts (Soulsister)
 Singer: Sarah Bettens
 Dutch-language singer: Dana Winner
 Live-act: Ashbury Faith
 Breakthrough: Moondog Jr.
 Musical export: 2 Unlimited
 International: Green Day

Records:
 Album: Everyday I Wear a Greasy Black feather on my Hat (Moondog Jr.)
 Single: "Not an Addict" (K's Choice)

Musical industry:
 Musical event: Torhout-Werchter
 Music journalist: Marc Didden
 Music photographer: Jo Clauwaert
 Radio presenter: Jan Hautekiet
 Radio program: BasSta!
 TV program: Rock Rapport (Ka2)

Lifetime Achievement Award: Wannes Vandevelde

1994
Artists:
 Band: dEUS
 Dutch-language band: Noordkaap
 Musician: Eric Melaerts (Soulsister)
 Singer: Axelle Red
 Dutch-language singer: Isabelle A.
 Live-act: Dinky Toys
 Breakthrough: dEUS
 International: Whitney Houston

Records:
 Album: Worst Case Scenario (dEUS)
 Album cover: Soulsister
 Single: "Hemelsblauw" (Will Tura)
 Video: "Via" (dEUS)

Musical industry:
 Manager: Soulsister
 Producer: Wouter Van Belle
 Record label: Double T Music
 Musical event: Marktrock
 Promotor: Herman Schueremans
 Radio or TV presenter: Jan Hautekiet
 Radio or TV program: De Gewapende Man (Jan Hautekiet)
 Film music: Suite 16

Lifetime Achievement Award: Toots Thielemans

External links
 Zamu Music Awards
 Muziekcentrum Vlaanderen
 List of past winners

Belgian music awards